A gamurra was an Italian style of women's dress popular in the fifteenth and early sixteenth centuries. It could also be called a camurra or camora in Florence or a zupa, zipa, or socha in northern Italy. It consisted of a fitted bodice and full skirt worn over a chemise (called a camicia). It was usually unlined. 

The gamurra probably developed from a fourteenth century garment called the gonna, gonnella, or sottana. Early styles were front-laced, but the fashion later changed to side-laced styles. The fashion for sleeves also changed: though sleeves earlier in the fifteenth century are attached to the bodice, after 1450, they are usually detached and laced or pinned to the bodice.

The gamurra could be worn on its own in the home or in an informal setting; in a formal setting, it would typically be worn underneath an overdress such as a giornea or a cioppa.

Gallery

References 
15th-century fashion
16th-century fashion
Dresses